Descent Glacier is a short, steep glacier between Briggs Hill and Condit Glacier, flowing northwest from Descent Pass into Ferrar Glacier, in Victoria Land. It was so named because of the adventurous descent made here by the party led by Albert Armitage of the British National Antarctic Expedition, 1901–04. The name seems to have been first used on maps of the British Antarctic Expedition, 1910–13.

References

Glaciers of Victoria Land
Scott Coast